Simon Prescott is an American voice actor who is best known for his work in the anime and film industries. Notable roles include Dr. Laughton in Metropolis and Aritomo Yamagata in Rurouni Kenshin.

Filmography

Anime

Akira – Dr. Onishi (Pioneer dub)
Argento Soma – Air Force Official A, Scientist A
Bastard!! – Great Priest Goe Note Soto
Casshan – Slave Elder
Cowboy Bebop – Doctor, Doohan
Cyborg 009: The Cyborg Soldier – Professor Isaac Gilmore
Dogtanian and the Three Muskehounds – King Louis XIII
Ghost in the Shell – Nakamura
Ghost in the Shell: Stand Alone Complex – Old Man
Kikaider 01: The Animation – Futen
Lupin the Third – Doctor Oz
Metropolis – Dr. Laughton
Mobile Suit Gundam movies – Degwin Sodo Zabi
Mobile Suit Gundam 0083: Stardust Memory – Eiphar Synapse
Mobile Suit Gundam F91 – Meitzer Ronah
Outlaw Star – Old Tao Master
Panda! Go Panda! – Zoo Master
Paranoia Agent – Goro Inukai
Rurouni Kenshin – Aritomo Yamagata
Samurai Champloo – Heitarou Kawara
Street Fighter Alpha: The Animation – Gouken
Street Fighter Alpha: Generations – Old Master
Street Fighter II: V – Grandfather, Caretaker
Teknoman – Darkon, Conrad Carter
Transformers: Robots in Disguise – Dr. Hikasye
 Wowser – Professor Dinghy

Other animated roles
 The Return of Dogtanian – King Louis XIII

Film
The Good, the Bad and the Ugly 2002 DVD – Angel Eyes
The Prince of Light: The Legend of Ramayana

Live-action

Bat Masterson (1960, TV Series) – Deputy Al
M Squad (1960, TV Series) – Danny Boy
Summer and Smoke (1961) – (uncredited)
Hell is for Heroes (1962) – Thomas
Hud (1963) – Man in Greased Pig Sequence
The Carpetbaggers (1964) – Reporter
Where Love Has Gone (1964) – (uncredited)
The Outer Limits (1964, TV Series) – The Guard
The Fugitive (1965–1966, TV Series) – Plainclothes Cop / Officer
Iron Horse (1966, TV Series) – Aces
Stagecoach (1966) – (uncredited)
Rough Night in Jericho (1967) – Card Player (uncredited)
Hell's Bloody Devils (1970)
Mission Impossible (1970, TV Series) – Security Guard
Devil Rider! (1970) – Penny's Attacker
Hangup (1974) – Morton
Bronk (1975, TV Series) – Pawnshop Operator
Rollercoaster (1977) – Supporting (uncredited)
The Dwelling (1993) – Hooker's Client
 Mighty Morphin Power Rangers (1995, TV Series) – Master Vile (uncredited)
Power Rangers Zeo (1996, TV Series) – Master Vile (uncredited)
Power Rangers: Lost Galaxy (1999, TV Series) – Loyax
Der Himmel kann warten (2000)
SpaceDisco One (2007) – O'Brian

Video games

.hack//Mutation – Additional Voices
.hack//Outbreak – Additional Voices
Dark Reign 2 – Ordic
Heavy Gear II – Petrus
Heroes of Might and Magic III: The Restoration of Erathia
Lords of Everquest – Additional Voices
Might and Magic VII: For Blood and Honor
Might and Magic IX
Seven Samurai 20XX - Necryl, Kyric
Star Trek: Judgment Rites – Bivander Zane, Uhland, Tuskin
Stonekeep – Torin, Gargoyle

References

External links

Simon Prescott at CrystalAcids Anime Voice Actor Database

Living people
American male voice actors
Year of birth missing (living people)